The 52nd Pennsylvania House of Representatives District is located in southwest Pennsylvania and has been represented by Ryan Warner since 2015.

District profile
The 52nd District is located in Fayette County and includes the following areas:

Belle Vernon
 Bullskin Township
Brownsville
Brownsville
Connellsville
 Connellsville Township
 Dawson
Dunbar
 Dunbar Township
 Everson
Fayette City
Franklin Township
Jefferson Township
 Lower Tyrone Township
Luzerne Township
Newell
Ohiopyle
 Perry Township
 Perryopolis
Redstone Township
 Saltlick Township
 Seven Springs (Fayette County Portion)
 South Connellsville
Springfield Township
Stewart Township
 Upper Tyrone Township
 Vanderbilt
Washington Township

Representatives

References

Government of Fayette County, Pennsylvania
Government of Washington County, Pennsylvania
52